Pine Hill is a neighborhood located in South Columbus, Georgia, near Fort Benning.

References

Columbus metropolitan area, Georgia
Neighborhoods in Columbus, Georgia